was a village located in Koshi District, Niigata Prefecture, Japan.

As of 2003, the village had an estimated population of 2,035 and a density of 51.09 persons per km². The total area was 39.83 km².

On April 1, 2005, Yamakoshi, along with the town of Oguni (from Kariwa District), the town of Nakanoshima (from Minamikanbara District), and the towns of Koshiji and Mishima (both from Santō District), was merged into the expanded city of Nagaoka.

On October 23, 2004, Yamakoshi was hit by the 2004 Chūetsu earthquake.

Transportation

Highway

Local attractions
 Bullfighting(:ja:牛の角突き)
 Rice Terraces

See also
 2004 Chūetsu earthquake

Dissolved municipalities of Niigata Prefecture
Nagaoka, Niigata